I Love You, It's Cool is the third studio album by Brooklyn-based indie rock band Bear in Heaven, released on April 3, 2012, on their own Hometapes label. It received generally favorable reviews from critics, and has a score of 66 based on 21 reviews at Metacritic.

Track listing

Charts

References

2012 albums
Bear in Heaven albums